Vracovice is name of several locations in the Czech Republic:
Vracovice (Benešov District)
Vracovice (Znojmo District)